Sikh genocide may refer to:

 Chhota Ghallughara, Punjabi for "Smaller Massacre", a genocide of Sikhs which was committed by the Mughal Empire in 1746 
 Vadda Ghalughara, Punjabi for "Greater Massacre", a genocide of Sikhs which was committed by the Durrani Empire in 1762 
 1984 Sikh genocide